Inayat Killi (or Inayat Qilla) is a town in Khar Bajaur Tehsil, Bajaur Agency, Federally Administered Tribal Areas, Pakistan. The population is 10,717 according to the 2017 census.

References 

Populated places in Bajaur District